Pallister is an area in the borough of Middlesbrough, North Yorkshire, England. It is located within the TS3 postcode area. The Pallister Ward (shared with the larger Berwick Hills) had population at the  2011 Census of 6,069, the ward was later renamed in 2015 to Berwick Hills and Pallister. 

The area, made up of mostly council houses, has developed a reputation over the years for crime and anti-social behaviour, although Middlesbrough Council and Erimus Housing have made it a target to reduce crime rates.

It is also known as Pallister Park or Pally Park because of the public park located at the northern edge of the area.

Education
There are two primary schools in the area - Pallister Park Primary School, on Gribdale Road and Corpus Christi RC Primary School, on Cargo Fleet Lane. There is a secondary school, Unity City Academy, towards the south of the area. The road that flows through the main area is Homerton Road and Cranmore Road.

Famous people from Pallister
 Stewart Downing Footballer
 Ged Parsons Comedy writer on television programmes such as 'Have I Got News For You', 'Mock the Week', etc.
 John McKitterick - Head of Fashion Design Department, Kingston University
Sean Davies - Footballer

References

External links
 

Areas within Middlesbrough